The Rosengarten group (Ladin: Ciadenac, Ciadenáze) is a massif in the Dolomites of northern Italy. It is located between the Tierser Tal and Eggental in South Tyrol and the Fassa Valley in Trentino.

One peculiarity of the Rosengarten is the pink shade, owing to the presence of the mineral dolomite, which takes in the sunset and "glows", as celebrated in the Bozner Bergsteigerlied. Meaning "Rose garden" in German, the name refers to the legend of King Laurin and his Rose Garden, a traditional story explaining the outer appearance of the mountain range.

Summits
Other peaks include:
 Rosengartenspitze - 
 Vajolet-Türme - 
 Laurinswand (Croda di Re Laurino) - 
 Tscheiner-Spitze (Cima Sforcella) - 
 Rotwand (Roda di Vaèl) - 
 Teufelswand (Croda Davoi) -

References

Mountains of the Alps
Mountains of South Tyrol
Dolomites